Thakur Akshay Singh Ratnu (24 December 1910 – 1 July 1995) was a Rajasthani, Brajbhasha and Hindi poet from Rajasthan. His penned poems criticising the British policies of divide & rule. He is considered as one of the modern traditionalist poets. He was a scholar of Hindi, Rajasthani, Dingal(Old Rajasthani), Urdu, Sanskrit and Prakrit. He has been awarded with epithets of 'Sahitya Bhushan', 'Sahitya Ratna', and 'Kavi Ratna'.

Early life and family 
Thakur Akshay Singh Ratnu was born on 24 December 1910 in a Ratnu-Charan family of Kali Pahari-Hanphawat village in Jaipur. His father was Thakur Jhujhar Singh Ratnu of Charanwas village in Nagaur, Rajasthan. His grandfather Thakur Jawahar Dan was well to do and affluent, his Hundi(credit instrument) used to operate from Kuchaman. His mother died while he was young. Akshay Singh was subsequently sent to Alwar where he was raised by his aunt. Thakur Akshay Singh has four sons and one daughter.

Education 
Thakur Akshay Singh completed his education in Alwar under his guru Girdharilal Bhatt Tailang. He learned Kaumudi, Raghuvansh, Kuvalyananda, Chandralak, and Amarkosh. He became a scholar of Hindi, Dingal, Sanskrit, Urdu, Rajasthani, Brajbhasha, and Prakrit.

Career 
Sources:

Akshay Singh began his career as a civil servant in the erstwhile princely state of Alwar. He was on good terms with the ruler Sawai Jaisingh. After Independence, Akshay Singh moved to Jaipur and served as Chief Reader in the Matsya Sangh, Sanyukt Rajasthan, and Jaipur Secretariat, finally retiring in 1968.

Alwar State was one of the first to declare Hindi as the official state language. Akshay Singh served as the Principal of the Hindi Training Center established to promote & teach Hindi.

Poet 
Sources:

Thakur Akshay Singh began composing poems at an early age. At the age of 6, he presented a poem to the Maharaja of Bikaner, Ganga Singh congratulating him on his Gang Nahar project to bring the river waters to the farmers in Ganganagar.

In 1939, Akshay Singh criticized the role of British Government for their divide & rule policy when they incited the Meo community of Alwar & surrounding regions which led to riots and the Maharaja of Alwar was banished to Abu & later to Bombay by the British Government. Akshay Singh penned a poem ‘Alwar me Ulatfer’ outlining the role of British. Akshay Singh also travelled to meet Maharaja Jai Singh who called on him during his banishment. He stayed with the ruler for 15 days at his request.

Akshay Singh criticized the move of removing Charans from the Walterkrit Charan Rajput Hitkarini Sabha.

He was given epithet of ‘Braj-Ratan’ by the Brajbhasha Akademi. The academy published a monograph on Thakur Akshay Singh Ratnu for his contribution in Brajbhasha literature.

Akshay Singh has also written on the themes of sacrifice of Jauhars of Chittor as well as Gandhian philoshphy.

Social service 
Akshay Singh led the efforts for the renovation of Karni Mata Temple in Mathura, originally built in the 16th century by Lakhaji Barhath. In Alwar, Thakur Akshay Singh constructed a Charan Boarding House(Chatravas) as well as Gujki Bhavan and Thabhawali Bhavan. In 1949, Akshay Singh moved to Jaipur and made efforts for the construction of a Charan Boarding House. He collected donations for the cause and was aided by Gulabdanji Hampavat(Kot) and Shishdanji Palawat(Kishanpura). The borading was inaugurated by the Revenue Secretary Hetudan Ujjwal.

Quote 
“अपनी भाषा अपना वेश, अपनी संस्कृति अपना देश, स्वतंत्रता का यह ही सार, सादा जीवन उच्च विचार।”"Our language our dress, our culture our country, this is the essence of freedom, simple life and dignified thoughts."

Works 
Sources:

 Akshaya kesarī, pratāpa caritra By Akshayasiṃha Ratnū · 1989
 Akshay Bharat Darshan
 Akshay Jan Smriti
 Walterkrit Charan Rajput Sabha ke naye rulings par do shabd
 Brajbhasha verse translation of the tenth skanda of Shrimad Bhagavad
 Alwar Mein Ulatfer (Khand Poetry)
 Akshay Tej Niti Samuchhay
 Dasori Darshan 
 Rajasthan Vandana 
 Bhisam Grisam
 Doha chhand aur uske vibbhin bhed
 Anyokti Gulab Ikkisi 
 Farishte varo hazaro
 Basant Varnan 
 Kashmir Vijay 
 Chittor ke teen Shake 
 Pat Parivartan 
 Jaipur ri Jhamal

References 

Rajasthani people
Indian poets
Charan
Indian independence activists from Rajasthan
People from Jaipur district
People from Alwar district
1910 births
1995 deaths
Administrators in the princely states of India
Dingal poets